The Minister of External Affairs (or simply, the Foreign Minister, in Hindi Videsh Mantri ) is the head of the Ministry of External Affairs of the Government of India. One of the senior-most offices in the Union Cabinet, the chief responsibility of the Foreign Minister is to represent India and its government in the international community. The Foreign Minister also plays an important role in determining Indian foreign policy. Occasionally, the Foreign Minister is assisted by a Minister of State for External Affairs or the lower-ranked Deputy Minister of External Affairs.

India's first Prime Minister, Jawaharlal Nehru, also held the Foreign Minister post throughout his 17-year premiership of the country; he remains the country's longest-serving Foreign Minister. Several other Prime Ministers have since held the additional charge of foreign minister, but never has any other cabinet minister held additional charge of the office. There have been a number of Foreign Ministers who went on to become the Prime Minister like Atal Bihari Vajpayee, P. V. Narasimha Rao and I. K. Gujral.

The current Minister of External Affairs is Subrahmanyam Jaishankar, succeeding Sushma Swaraj of the Bharatiya Janata Party on 30 May 2019.

List of External Affairs Ministers

List of Ministers of States

See also
 Indian Foreign Secretary
 S Jaishankar

References

External links
 Official Website of Ministry of External Affairs
 MEA Library

Union ministers of India
India
Ministers for External Affairs of India
Ministry of External Affairs (India)
Lists of government ministers of India